Viva Orange is a line on the Viva bus rapid transit system in York Region, Ontario, Canada. The route primarily runs in an east–west direction along the Highway 7 Rapidway in Vaughan. It is operated by Tok Transit under contract from York Region.

Route description 
Viva Orange runs mostly along Highway 7, between Martin Grove Road and Richmond Hill Centre Terminal on Yonge Street. The route connects with the Toronto subway's Line 1 Yonge–University at Vaughan Metropolitan Centre station.

There are 17 stations currently in operation.

Transit system integration

Brampton Transit 
Viva Orange shares routing with Brampton Transit's 501 Züm Queen express bus route between Martin Grove and Vaughan Metropolitan Centre (VMC), and has been fare integrated with it since its creation in September 2010. Both Brampton Transit and York Region Transit proofs of payment are accepted for the entire length of both bus routes.

Toronto Transit Commission (TTC) 
Viva Orange connects with the TTC's Yonge–University subway at VMC station. However there are currently no free transfers between the TTC and YRT. As a result, a separate TTC or YRT fare is required to transfer between the subway and Viva Orange or other YRT buses.

Route changes 
Viva Orange originally began service on October 16, 2005 and operated between Martin Grove Road on Highway 7 and  subway station via York University. On December 17, 2017 the Line 1 Yonge–University extension opened and replaced service between Sheppard West and Highway 7. Viva Orange's eastern terminus was relocated to the Richmond Hill Centre Terminal to coincide with the subway's opening.

Future 
In 2020, the western terminus will be extended to Highway 50 with additional stops at Highway 427 and Highway 27. In 2023 an additional branch at will be created at the eastern terminus between Promenade Terminal and Finch station.

Rapidway

Viva Orange operates along dedicated right of way (dubbed Rapidways) between Wigwoss–Helen and Richmond Hill Centre Terminal. Eventually, the entire Highway 7 Corridor could be upgraded to light rail transit.

See also 
 501 Züm Queen
 Viva Purple

References 

Orange